Khatsunob is a rural locality (a selo) in Tlogobsky Selsoviet, Gunibsky District, Republic of Dagestan, Russia. The population was 62 as of 2010.

Geography 
Khatsunob is located 44 km northwest of Gunib (the district's administrative centre) by road, on the Kunada River. Khenda and Bolshoy Urala are the nearest rural localities.

Nationalities 
Avars live there.

References 

Rural localities in Gunibsky District